Oliff Peterson was an American politician in the state of Washington. He served in the Washington House of Representatives from 1889 to 1891 as a member of the Republican party.

References

Members of the Washington House of Representatives